The First Damned is a demo compilation by Polish technical death metal band Decapitated. It was released on 20 November 2000. It is a compilation of demos, Cemeterial Gardens and The Eye of Horus, and two additional live tracks recorded during the Thrash 'Em All Festival in 2000. The First Damned was released on one disc.

Track listing
All music written and composed by Decapitated. All lyrics written by Sauron, except where noted.
 "Intro" – 0:16
 "The Eye of Horus" – 5:28
 "Blessed" – 5:06
 "The First Damned" – 5:48
 "Nine Steps" – 4:55
 "Dance Macabre" – 2:49
 "Mandatory Suicide" – 3:29 (Slayer cover)
 "Destiny" – 5:33
 "Way to Salvation" – 3:54
 "Ereshkigal" – 3:47
 "Cemeteral Gardens" – 6:19
 "Way to Salvation" (live) – 3:58
 "Nine Steps" (live) – 5:14

Personnel

Decapitated 
 Wojciech "Sauron" Wąsowicz – vocals
 Wacław "Vogg" Kiełtyka – guitars
 Marcin "Martin" Rygiel – bass
 Witold "Vitek" Kiełtyka – drums

Production 
 Bartlomiej Kuźniak – mastering
 Mariusz Kurasz – engineering
 Piotr Łukaszewski – engineering
 Arkadiusz Malczewski – engineering
 Jacek Wiśniewski – cover art

References

Decapitated (band) albums
2000 compilation albums
Metal Mind Productions albums